The United Hungarian National Socialist Party (EMNSP) was a far-right political party in Hungary during the late 1930s.

History
The party first contested national elections in 1939, winning four seats in the parliamentary elections that year. Following the outbreak of World War II the party did not contest any further elections.

Election results

National Assembly

References

Far-right political parties in Hungary
Defunct political parties in Hungary
Fascism in Hungary